Erbse is a surname. Notable people with the surname include:
Hartmut Erbse (1915–2004), German classical philologist
Heimo Erbse (1924–2005), German composer